Ruth Schwartz Cowan (born 1941) is an American historian of science, technology and medicine noted for her research on the history of human and medical genetics, as well as on the history of household technologies. She is also the author of a widely used textbook on the social history of American technology.

Biography 
Cowan was born in Brooklyn, New York, the daughter of Betty (a home-maker and antique-dealer) and Louis E. Schwartz (an attorney and office manager). She attended the excellent Brooklyn public schools, graduating (in 1957) from Midwood High School.  Cowan has a B.A. in zoology from Barnard College, an M.A. in history from the University of California at Berkeley, and a Ph.D. in the history of science from Johns Hopkins University.  Her doctoral dissertation, "Sir Francis Galton and the Study of Heredity in the 19th Century," was supervised by William Coleman.

Cowan was a professor of history at SUNY Stony Brook from 1967 to 2002.  She also served as Director of Women's Studies from 1985 to 1990 and Chair of the Honors College from 1997 to 2002. Cowan is a Professor Emerita at the University of Pennsylvania.

Cowan's book More Work for Mother found that since 1700, "technological change shifted the burden of domestic labor from adult men and children to mothers and wives."

Honors and awards 
Cowan's More Work for Mother received the Dexter Prize from the Society for the History of Technology in 1984. In 1997 the Society for the History of Technology also awarded her the Leonardo da Vinci Medal. 

Cowan received the John Desmond Bernal Prize in 2007 for distinguished scholarly contributions to the field of Science and Technology Studies (STS) for her textbook A Social History of American Technology.

Cowan was elected to the American Philosophical Society in 2014.

Selected publications 
 More Work for Mother: The Ironies of Household Technology from the Open Hearth to the Microwave. Basic Books. 1983. 
 A Social History of American Technology, Oxford University Press, 1997,

References

External links 
 Ruth Schwartz Cowan-University of Pennsylvania page

1941 births
Living people
Science and technology studies scholars
Home economists
Stony Brook University faculty
University of Pennsylvania faculty
Johns Hopkins University alumni
Barnard College alumni
UC Berkeley College of Letters and Science alumni
Place of birth missing (living people)
Leonardo da Vinci Medal recipients
Midwood High School alumni